The enzyme citryl-CoA lyase catalyzes the chemical reaction

(3S)-citryl-CoA  acetyl-CoA + oxaloacetate

This enzyme belongs to the family of lyases, specifically the oxo-acid-lyases, which cleave carbon-carbon bonds.  The systematic name of this enzyme class is (3S)-citryl-CoA oxaloacetate-lyase (acetyl-CoA-forming). This enzyme is also called (3S)-citryl-CoA oxaloacetate-lyase.  This enzyme participates in citrate cycle (tca cycle).

References

 
 

EC 4.1.3
Enzymes of unknown structure